Avocaré Island (Avoquer, Avocaire, L'Avocaire) is an island located in the St Brandon archipelago.

In the World Bank Report creating the marine protected area of St. Brandon, Avocaré Island was classified as a Group 3 Island together with Île Raphael, L'Île Coco and L'île du Sud.

In 1846, Avocaré Island was visited by British naval officer Edward Belcher aboard HMS Samarang, who confirmed that it was then a principal fishing station with fishermen catching 102 kg of fish per day. Avocaré Island is today an uninhabited bird and turtle sanctuary. Access to the island is restricted to prevent the introduction of invasive alien species.

See also 

Mascarene Islands
 St Brandon
 Mauritius
 Île Raphael
 L'île du Sud
 L'île du Gouvernement
 L'Île Coco

References 

Islands of St. Brandon
Outer Islands of Mauritius
Reefs of the Indian Ocean
Fishing areas of the Indian Ocean
Important Bird Areas of Mauritius
Atolls of the Indian Ocean